"Deadwood" is a song by American recording artist Toni Braxton released on September 14, 2017. The song serves as the lead single from Braxton's  eighth studio album Sex & Cigarettes (2018). Written by Braxton, Royce Doherty, Kwame Ogoo and Fred Ball and produced by Ball.

Background and release
On August 25, 2017, it was announced that director Bille Woodruff was directing a new music video for Braxton confirming the name of a new single titled "Deadwood". On September 5, 2017, in an interview with The Insider, Braxton confirmed the title of her upcoming eighth studio album Sex & Cigarettes stating "I feel like I'm older, I wanna say what I feel. I don't wanna be censored". Braxton released the cover art of the single on September 12, 2017.

Critical reception
The song was met with positive reviews from critics. That Grape Juice favored the track "Ever in fine-form, this gorgeous guitar-led offering proves that her tone has lost none of its buttery brilliance. The production serves as a slick, crisp vehicle driving the song's lyrical agenda and does so dynamically. Marvellous melody and memorable hook too." Essence stated: "Deadwood, is the first step to revealing an uncensored Braxton. It's the debut track from her upcoming album, which is set for release at the top of 2018, and sees the singer exploring a complicated love." Rap-Up gave a positive review of the track stating "Toni Braxton comes back to life with 'Deadwood,' the first single off her forthcoming album Sex & Cigarettes. Over guitar strums, hard drums, and soothing violin strings, the R&B songbird sings about heartbreak and rejuvenation with a soulful air."

Music video
The music video was filmed on August 24, 2017, and directed by Bille Woodruff. The audio video for the song was released to Braxton's Vevo account on September 14, 2017. The video premiered on October 6, 2017.

Credits and personnel 
Credits adapted from the liner notes of Sex & Cigarettes.

 Jonathan Allen – recording
 Fred Ball – instruments, producer, writer
 Paul Boutin – mixing, percussion
 Toni Braxton – producer, vocals, writer
 Royce Doherty – writer
 Ben Epstein – bass

 Clarissa Farran – strings arranger
 Steve Fitzmaurice – recording
 Earl Harvin – drums
 Kwame Ogoo – backing vocalist, guitar, writer
 Hilary Skewes – stings contractor

Charts

Release history

References

2017 singles
Toni Braxton songs
Songs written by Toni Braxton
Contemporary R&B ballads
2017 songs
Def Jam Recordings singles
Songs written by Fred Ball (producer)
Soul ballads
Songs about heartache
2010s ballads